The Anglesey flag is the flag of the County of Anglesey. It was  registered by the Flag Institute in March 2014.

History
The design is a banner form of the coat of the arms ascribed by later medieval heralds, to the earlier, locally celebrated Welsh Lord Hwfa ap Cynddelw of Llifon and a steward to Owain Gwynedd Prince of the Welsh. The earliest reference to the arms seems to be in the work of the bard Lewys Glyn Cothi from the period of 1447 to 1486 although there is no evident explanation for the choice of colours or charges used. A late c. 15th-century stained-glass window with the arms referring to Hwfa are apparently depicted in the east window of Llangadwaladr church on the island. According to the heraldic historian Wilfrid Scott-Giles, Anglesey County Council used the Hwfa arms informally before they were incorporated into the design granted to them officially. Between 1857 and 1950 the arms were used by Anglesey Constabulary. An association between the Hwfa arms and the island county of Anglesey is thus long established.

External links
[ Flag Institute – Anglesey]
"A flag for Anglesey on Anglesey Hidden Gem''
Anglesey at Flags of the World

Anglesey
Anglesey
Anglesey